Tomellana is a genus of sea snail marine gastropod mollusks in the family Clavatulidae.

Tomellana is a replacement name for Tomella Swainson, 1840, a junior homonym of Tomella Robineau-Desvoidy, 1830  (order Diptera)

Description
The smooth and shining shell has a fusiform shape. The spire consists of 10 - 11 whorls and is not much longer than the body whorl. The first 1½ whorls are smooth and translucent. The width of the whorls increase slowly into becoming a bulging body whorl. The whorls are separated by a simple suture. The aperture is oval. The inner lip shows a thick callosity at the top. The siphonal canal is short and wide.

Species
 † Tomellana aueri Harzhauser, Landau & R. Janssen, 2022 
 † Tomellana dulaii Harzhauser, Landau & R. Janssen, 2022 
 Tomellana hupferi Strebel, 1912
 † Tomellana jouannetii (Des Moulins, 1842) 
 Tomellana leschkei (Strebel, 1912)
 Tomellana lineata (Lamarck, 1818)
 † Tomellana praecursor (Schaffer, 1912) 
 † Tomellana semimarginata (Lamarck, 1822) 
Species brought into synonymy
 Tomellana pfefferi (Strebel, 1912): synonym of Fusiturris pfefferi (Strebel, 1912)

References

 Wenz, W. (1938-1944). Gastropoda. Teil 1: Allgemeiner Teil und Prosobranchia. xii + 1639 pp. In: Schindewolf, O.H. (Ed.) Handbuch der Paläozoologie, Band 6. Bornträger, Berlin. Lief. 1, 1-240

External links
 
 William Swainson. A Treatise on Malacology or Shells and Shellflsh 1840, pag.314; London, Longman. viii + 419 pp
 Bouchet, P.; Kantor, Y. I.; Sysoev, A.; Puillandre, N. (2011). A new operational classification of the Conoidea. Journal of Molluscan Studies. 77, 273-308
 Nolf F. (2015). The genus Tomellana (Mollusca: Gastropoda: Clavatulidae) in West Africa: a comprehensive Survey and establishment of Fusiturris kribiensis Bozzetti, 2015 as a junior synonym. Neptunea. 13(4): 17-37
 Bouchet, P.; Kantor, Y. I.; Sysoev, A.; Puillandre, N. (2011). A new operational classification of the Conoidea (Gastropoda). Journal of Molluscan Studies. 77(3): 273-308
 Harzhauser, M.; Landau, B.; Janssen, R. (2022). The Clavatulidae (Gastropoda, Conoidea) of the Miocene Paratethys Sea with considerations on fossil and extant Clavatulidae genera. Zootaxa. 5123(1): 1-172